Roberto Bravo (born 1947 in Villa Azueta, Veracruz, Mexico) is a Mexican novelist and a short story writer.

Bibliography
Al sur de la frontera (South of the Border)
No es como usted dice (It's not as you say)
Vida del Orate (Life of the Orate)
Lo que quedó de Roy Orbison (What is left of Roy Orbison)
De Cuerpo entero (Of Whole Body)
Si tú mueres primero (If You Die First)
Itinerario Inicial (First Itinarary) (An anthology of the new Mexican Narrative)
Tierra Adentro (Inland).
"El Infierno es un horizonte abierto" (Hell is an open horizon)
"El hombre del diván" (Divan Man)
"La sociedad de los moribundos" (The Society of the Dying)
"Brisa del sur" (Southern Breeze)
"Antología de Escritores Escoceses Contemporáneos" (Anthology of Contemporany Scottish Writers)
" BOUND" (En colaboración con Christina McBride)

References

1947 births
Mexican male writers
Living people
Writers from Veracruz